Snake Creek is a stream in the U.S. state of South Dakota. It is a tributary of Grand River.

Snake Creek was so named on account of its frequent meanders.

See also
List of rivers of South Dakota

References

Rivers of Corson County, South Dakota
Rivers of South Dakota